Daniel Wheelwright Gooch (January 8, 1820 – November 1, 1891) was a United States representative from Massachusetts.

Early life and education

Gooch, the son of John and Olive ( Winn) Gooch, was born in Wells in Massachusetts' District of Maine (Maine achieved statehood two months after Gooch's birth). He attended the public schools, Phillips Academy, and graduated from Dartmouth College. He studied law, was admitted to the bar and commenced practice in Boston.

Career
Gooch served as a member of the Massachusetts House of Representatives, was a member of the State constitutional convention in 1853, and was elected as a Republican to the Thirty-fifth Congress to fill the vacancy caused by the resignation of Nathaniel P. Banks.  He was reelected to the four succeeding Congresses and served from January 31, 1858, to September 1, 1865 when he resigned.  He was appointed Navy agent of the port of Boston in 1865, but removed by President Andrew Johnson. He was again elected to the Forty-third Congress (March 4, 1873 – March 3, 1875), but was an unsuccessful candidate for reelection in 1874 to the Forty-fourth Congress.

He then became a pension agent in Boston 1876-1886, resumed the practice of law and also engaged in literary pursuits.  Gooch died in Melrose on November 11, 1891 and was interred in Wyoming Cemetery.

References

 Retrieved on 2009-04-07
Rand, John Clark, One of a Thousand A series of Biographical Sketches of One Thousand Representative Men Resident in the Commonwealth of Massachusetts. pages 252-253, (1890).

External links
 

People of Massachusetts in the American Civil War
Republican Party members of the Massachusetts House of Representatives
Dartmouth College alumni
1820 births
1891 deaths
People from Wells, Maine
Republican Party members of the United States House of Representatives from Massachusetts
19th-century American politicians